FC Podolye Podolsky district is a Russian football team from Podolsky district (later Moscow), founded in 1996. It played professionally in the third-tier Russian Professional Football League from 2011–12 season to 2014–15 season, after which it was dissolved due to debts to tax authorities.

Historical team names and home cities
1996–2001: FC Podolye Klimovsk
2002–2004: FC Podolye Podolsk
2005–2009: FC Podolye Voronovo

External links
  Official site
  Team profile at www.2liga.ru
  Team profile at klisf.info

References

Association football clubs established in 1996
Association football clubs disestablished in 2015
Football clubs in Russia
Football in Moscow Oblast
1996 establishments in Russia
2015 disestablishments in Russia